Kevin Roth (born 1957 in Philadelphia, Pennsylvania) is a singer-songwriter, pianist, artist, and Mountain Dulcimer player. He is widely known as one of the leading innovators of the dulcimer around the world and has released over 60 albums. He sang the theme song for the PBS television children's hit show Shining Time Station. His latest recording (to date) is "The Deviant Dulcimerist," released on the Star Gazer Productions label. A full biography and more information can be found online at www.kevinrothmusic.com.

Discography 
1975: Kevin Roth Sings and Plays Dulcimer (Folkways Records)
1976: Somebody Give Me Direction (Folkways Records)
1976: The Other Side of the Mountain (Folkways Records)
1977: The Mountain Dulcimer Instrumental Album (Folkways Records)
1978: The First Few Words: Mountain Dulcimer Instrumental Album, Vol. 2 (Folkways Records)
1979: Dulcimer Instruction Album (Folkways Records)
1980: New Wind (Folkways Records)
1981: The Living and the Breathing Wind (Folkways Records)
1981: Women (Folkways Records)
1982: Dulcimer Man (Folkways Records)
1982: The Quiet Times (Folkways Records)
1983: Don't Wait For Me and Songs of the First Decade (Folkways Records)
1983: High on the Mountain (Folk Tradition Records)
1986: Unbearable Bears (Marlboro Records)
1986: Oscar Bingo and Buddies (Marlboro Records)
1987: After the Rain (Marlboro Records)
1987: Strings of Joy (Marlboro Records)
1987: The Secret Journey (Marlboro Records)
1988: The Sandman... (Marlboro Records)
1988: Animal Crackers and Other Tasty Tunes (Marlboro Records)
1992: The Gentleness of Living (Marlboro Records)
1992: Daddysongs (Sony Kids)
1992: Dinosaurs & Dragons (Sony Kids)
1992: Lullabies for Little Dreamers (Sony Kids)
1992: The Toy Maker's Christmas (Marlboro Records)
1992: Voyages (Flying Fish)
1994: Travel Song Sing Alongs (Marlboro Records)
1994: Camp & Fireside Songs  (Marlboro Records)
1995: Adventures of Sir Rabbit & Bunny Junction (Marlboro Records)
1996: Now I Lay Me Down to Sleep (Marlboro Records)
1997: Train Songs & Other Tracks (Marlboro Records)
1998: Train Song Sing Alongs (Star Gazer Productions)
1998: Choo Choo Tunes and Other Children's Favorites (Star Gazer Productions)
2001: Baby's Lullabies & Morning Wake Up Songs (Star Gazer Productions)
2001: Holiday Songs on the Dulcimer (Star Gazer Productions)
2001: America: Songs of Hope & Freedom (Star Gazer Productions)
2002: The Sunflower Collection (Star Gazer Productions)
2003: Children's First Songs (Star Gazer Productions)
2003: Music of the Soul Zither (Star Gazer Productions)
2003: Searching for Angels (Star Gazer Productions)
2004: Dulcimer World (Star Gazer Productions)
2005: Animal Songs for Children (Star Gazer Productions)
2005: One Big Family (Star Gazer Productions)
2006: Between the Notes (Star Gazer Productions)
2007: (Wabby Wabbit's) Lullabies and Snuggle Songs (Star Gazer Productions)
2007: Children's Classic Songs (Star Gazer Productions)
2007: Folk Songs for Little Folks (Star Gazer Productions)
2008: Wabby Wabbit's Lullabies & Snuggle Songs (Star Gazer Productions)
2009: Autoharp Songs and Solos (Kevin Roth Music)
2009: The Adventures of Wabby Wabbit (Star Gazer Productions)
2011: My Quiet Times: Hammer Dulcimer Lullaby Instrumentals (My Quiet Times LLC)
2015: Awakenings (Star Gazer Productions)
2016: Reawakening (Neworld Multimedia LLC)
2019: The Deviant Dulcimerist (Star Gazer Productions)
2023: Songs from the Book Between the Notes (Kevin Roth Music)

Roth with Ola Belle Reed
1976: My Epitaph: A Documentary in Song and Lyric (Folkways Records)
1976: Rising Sun Melodies (Folkways Records)
1978: All In One Evening (Folkways Records)

Roth with Janet Biely
2000: Mozart and Me (Star Gazer Productions)
2002: A Merry Mozart Christmas (Star Gazer Productions)

Roth with Janet Jackson Witman
2000: Celtic Harp & Other Lullabies (Star Gazer Productions)
2009: Music of the Harp: Celtic, Zither & Autoharp, Vol. 1 (Kevin Roth & Janet Jackson Witman)
2009: Music of the Harp: Celtic, Zither & Autoharp, Vol. 2 (Kevin Roth & Janet Jackson Witman)

Roth with Cheyenne Luzader
2003: Guided Imagery for Stress Release and Relaxtion with Soul Zither Music and Sounds of the Ocean (Star Gazer Productions)

Singles
2012: Even When I'm Long Gone (Star Gazer Productions)
2012: Citizen's Insurance (Citi-Sin) (Star Gazer Productions)
2021: Dulcimeditation (Kevin Roth Music)

References

External links 
 
 Home Page
 Folk Wonder
 Roth at Folkways Records

American folk singers
American male singers
Living people
1957 births
Musicians from Philadelphia
Singers from Pennsylvania
Songwriters from Pennsylvania
American male songwriters